Cork Celtic F.C., originally Evergreen United F.C., was an Irish football club based in Cork. They played in the League of Ireland between 1951 and 1979 and played their home games at Turners Cross. In 1974, they were League of Ireland champions and the following season they reached the second round of the European Cup.

History

Evergreen United
The club's foundation date is unknown, but its earliest appearance in the FAI Cup was in 1936–37. Evergreen finished as League runners-up in 1954 and 1959. In 1953 they also played in an all-Cork FAI Cup final against Cork Athletic, losing 2–1 in a replay after drawing the first game 2-2. During the 1956–57 season Evergreen's Donal Leahy finished as joint top goalscorer in the league with 15 goals. In the following two seasons Leahy finished top goalscorer outright with 16 and 22 goals respectively. Irish international Tommy Moroney finished his playing career with Evergreen and, on 4 October 1953 in a World Cup qualifier against France, he won the last of his 12 caps while with the club. In 1959 the club changed its name to Cork Celtic.

Cork Celtic
As Celtic in the 1960s they enjoyed a local rivalry with Cork Hibernians. Attendances reaches record highs in the late 1960s, with players such as Carl Davenport, the Dav, drawing crowds of up to 18,000. In 1974 with a team that included Alfie Hale and Bobby Tambling, Celtic won their only League of Ireland title under manager and former player Paul O'Donovan. Tambling, a former Chelsea player and England international had initially moved to Ireland to work as a Jehovah's Witness missionary. He scored 7 league goals in his first season as he helped Celtic win the title.

Best, Hurst and Seeler
In subsequent seasons Celtic attracted several other notable players. On the back of League success in 1974, Paul O'Donovan signed George Best and then Geoff Hurst. In December 1975 George Best had a brief spell with Celtic in between equally brief spells at Stockport County and Los Angeles Aztecs. He played only three league games, against Drogheda United, Bohemians and Shelbourne, but despite attracting big crowds he failed to score or impress. In 1976 Geoff Hurst spent a month with Celtic, scoring three goals during his brief stay. Uwe Seeler also played one game for Celtic during the 1977–78 season and scored twice in a 6–2 defeat to Shamrock Rovers.

Demise
At the start of the 1977–78 season Celtic looked for a longer lease on Turners Cross in order to develop it for the purpose of raising additional income. The club, now in decline since winning the League in 1973–74, saw developing Turners Cross as their only means of survival. The FAI's legal advisers had previously been unable to find the property owner or their original lease, however a complex ownership structure was eventually unravelled. Unable to resolve the tenancy situation with the FAI, Celtic spent no money on the upkeep of Turners Cross and it was eventually deemed unfit for use by the League for the 1978–79 season. As a result, the club moved to Flower Lodge for what would be their final season. But three years of deteriorating relationships with both the League and the F.A.I. led to Celtic being expelled from the League in the summer of 1979.

Despite exiting the League, Cork Celtic's holding company still held the sub-lease on Turners Cross, and the club proposed joining the Munster Senior League. However the Munster F.A. refused, and the trustees of the club eventually relinquished the lease on Turners Cross in 1980, bringing the club to an end.

Honours
League of Ireland: 1
1973–74
League of Ireland Shield: 1
1960–61
Dublin City Cup: 1
1961–62
Top Four Cup: 4
1956–57, 1958–59, 1959–60, 1973–74
Munster Senior League: 2
 1936–37, 1955–56
Munster Senior Cup: 6
 1951–52, 1959–60, 1961–62, 1963–64, 1971–72, 1973–74
FAI Junior Cup
Winners: 1935–36: 1
Runners Up: 1934–35: 1
FAI Youth Cup
Winners: 1938–39, 1948–49: 2
Runners Up: 1961–62, 1976–77: 2

Season placings

European record

Overview

Matches

Notable former players
 Florrie Burke
 Tommy Moroney
 Donal Leahy
 Jim "Jimux" O'Keeffe GK
 Paul O'Donovan
 Kevin Blount
 Dinny Allen
 Jimmy Barry-Murphy
 Amby Fogarty
 Alfie Hale
 Patsy Dorgan
 Keelan Hegarty
 Jimmy O'Neill
 Geoff Hurst
 Bobby Tambling
 George Best
 Billy McCullough
 Uwe Seeler
 Barry Notley
 Alec Ludzic

Notable former managers
 Paul O'Donovan
 Bobby Tambling
 Alfie Hale

See also
 League of Ireland in Cork city
 1962 League of Ireland Championship play-off

References

External links
Cork teams in FAI Cup finals
League of Ireland Topscorers

 
Defunct League of Ireland clubs
Association football clubs in County Cork
Association football clubs in Cork (city)
Association football clubs disestablished in 1980
1980 disestablishments in Ireland